Kazero was a French pop duo (Éric Casero and Véronique Segaud) from Toulouse (Occitania) 1986-1987.

Discography 

 1986  Thaï nana
 1987  Whoopy Machine

References

French musical duos